An outfall is the discharge point of a waste stream into a body of water; alternatively it may be the outlet of a river, drain or a sewer where it discharges into the sea, a lake or ocean.

In the United States, industrial facilities that discharge storm water which was exposed to industrial activities at the site  are required to have a multi-sector general permit. Issuing permits for storm water is delegated to the individual states that are authorized by the EPA. Facilities that apply for a permit must specify the number of outfalls at the site.  According to the EPA's 2008 MSGP (final version), outfalls are locations where the stormwater exits the facility, including pipes, ditches, swales, and other structures that transport stormwater. If there is more than one outfall present, measure at the primary outfall (i.e., the outfall with the largest volume of stormwater discharge associated with industrial activity).

Outfalls from sewage plants can be up to 20 feet in diameter and release 4000 gallons of treated human waste every second, only miles from the shore.

A wastewater treatment system discharges treated effluent to a water body from an outfall. An ocean outfall may be conveyed several miles offshore, to discharge by nozzles at the end of a spreader or T-shaped structure. Outfalls may also be constructed as an outfall tunnel or subsea tunnel and discharge effluent to the ocean via one or more marine risers with nozzles.

See also
 Combined sewer
 Greywater
 Marine outfall
 Night soil
 River mouth

References 

Sewerage infrastructure